Rahi, also called Rahimai, is the regional form of Hindu goddess Radha. This form is associated with the Vithoba (Vitthal) form of Hindu deity Krishna in the region of Maharashtra, India. According to the local legends, Rahi or Radhika is the wife of Vitthal.  Indian sociologist G.S. Ghurye states that the regional form Rahi is derived from Radhika, another name of goddess Radha.

Worship 
Goddess Rahi along with the other deities is worshiped at the Vithoba temple of Pandharpur region. Inside the temple, there are two separate temples close to the south of goddess Rakhumai's temple. One temple has idol of goddess Satyabhama and the other temple has idol of goddess Rahi or Radhika.

See also 
 Radha
 Vithoba

References 

Regional Hindu goddesses
Consorts of Krishna
Hindu given names